Henry Yeomans (c. March 24, 1805–?) was a farmer and political figure in Nova Scotia, Canada. He represented Hants County in the Nova Scotia House of Assembly in 1874 as a Liberal member.

He was born in Halifax, the son of Henry Yeomans. Yeomans was elected to the provincial assembly in an 1874 by-election held after William McDougall resigned his seat. He lived in Shubenacadie.

References 
 A Directory of the Members of the Legislative Assembly of Nova Scotia, 1758-1958, Public Archives of Nova Scotia (1958)

1805 births
Year of death missing
Nova Scotia Liberal Party MLAs